Anocisseis is a genus of beetles in the family Buprestidae, containing the following species:

 Anocisseis danieli Bily, 1997
 Anocisseis pretiosissima (Kerremans, 1900)
 Anocisseis samarensis Bellamy, 1990

References

Buprestidae genera